is the second single by Japanese music trio Candies. Written by Michio Yamagami and Kōichi Morita, the single was released on January 21, 1974. The first version of this song appeared on their debut album Anata ni Muchū ~Uchiki na Candies~; it was also track number three on their second album Abunai Doyobi ~Candies No Sekai~, with a different mix.

The song peaked at No. 39 on Oricon's singles chart and sold over 63,000 copies.

Track listing 
All lyrics are written by Michio Yamagami; all music is written by Kōichi Morita; all music is arranged by Yūsuke Hoguchi.

Chart positions

Cover versions 
 The Possible covered the song as the B-side of their 2007 single "Shushoku = Gohan no Uta".

References

External links 
 
 
 

1974 singles
1974 songs
Candies (group) songs
Sony Music Entertainment Japan singles
Songs written by Koichi Morita (songwriter)